(Classical orthography),  (Mistralian orthography), , or  is the dialect that was historically spoken in the city of Nice, in France, and in all the area of the historical County of Nice. The affiliation of Niçard is debated: it is generally considered a subdialect of Provençal, itself a dialect of Occitan, while some scholars argue that the historical dialect spoken in Nice was more strictly Ligurian.

Most residents of Nice and its region no longer speak Niçard, and the very few who do are fully bilingual in French as Nissard has lost its function of a vehicular language since decades. Nonetheless, today there is a developing revival of the use of the language. Some local television news is presented in Niçard (with French subtitles) and street signs in the old town of Nice are written in the dialect as well as in French. The Niçard song  is often regarded as the "anthem" of Nice.

Writing system

Niçard is written using two forms:
 Classical orthography.
 Mistralian orthography.

An Italian orthography was abandoned when Nice joined the French Empire in 1861. It was briefly reinstated in 1942 and 1943 when Italy occupied and administered the city.

Example of Nissart and similarity with Italian, according to Barberis:

.

Occitan and Ligurian influences
Regional differences are recognized in Standard Occitan. Some have claimed that Niçard has kept some of the oldest forms of Occitan, other dialects (such as Provençal) having been more "Frenchified" by their history (namely, regarding proparoxytone words).

Giuseppe Garibaldi, born in Nice in 1807 from Italian immigrants who had settled there, claimed that "Nizzardo" was an Italian dialect with some influences from Occitan and French, and for this reason promoted the union of Nice to the Kingdom of Italy. Before the annexation of the county of Nice to France in 1860, all the historical texts and archives of the city were written either in the Ligurian language, or in Italian. The entire population of Nice before the 1960s had Italian surnames. The Niçard Vespers were three days of popular uprising of the inhabitants of Nice in 1871, promoted by Giuseppe Garibaldi in favor of the union of the county of Nice with the Kingdom of Italy.

However, most experts in Romance linguistics see Niçard as a variety of Occitan. Claims that Niçard is a Ligurian or Italian dialect are not supported by these experts (see especially Dalbera 1984).

See also
Félibrige
Italian irredentism in Nice
Ligurian language
Monégasque language
Nissa La Bella

References

Sources

 Andrews James Bruyn (1875) Essai de grammaire du dialecte mentonnais avec quelques contes, chansons et musique du pays, Nice: no name [re-ed. 1978, 1981, Menton: Société d’Art et d’Histoire du Mentonnais]
 Andrews James Bruyn (1877) Vocabulaire français-mentonnais, Nice: no name [re-ed. 1977, Marseilles: Lafitte Reprints]
 Baquié Joan-Pèire (1987) (collab. Andrieu SAISSI) Empari lo niçard / Apreni lo provençau, Nice: CRDP Nice / CDDP Alpes Maritimes
 Barberis  Francesco. Nizza italiana: raccolta di varie poesie italiane e nizzarde, corredate di note. Editore Tip. Sborgi e Guarnieri (Nizza, 1871). University of California, 2007
 Bec Pierre (1970–71) (collab. Octave NANDRIS, Žarko MULJAČIĆ), Manuel pratique de philologie romane, Paris: Picard, 2 vol.
 Blaquièra J. (1985) Dictionnaire français-nissart, langue d'oc, dialecte niçois, self-edited
 Calvino Jean-Baptiste (1905) Nouveau dictionnaire niçois-français, Nice: Imprimerie des Alpes Maritimes [re-ed. 1993 with the following title: Dictionnaire niçois-français, français-niçois, Nîmes: Lacour]
 Carles (Père) Pietro (1866) Piccolo vocabolario nizzardo-italiano, Nice
 Carles (Père) Pietro (1868) Piccolo vocabolario italiano-nizzardo, Nice
 Castellana Georges (1947) Dictionnaire niçois-français [re-ed. 2001, Nice: Serre]
 CastellanaGeorges (1952) Dictionnaire français-niçois [re-ed. 2001, Nice: Serre]
 Cerquiglini Bernard (2003) (dir.) Les langues de France, Paris: Presses Universitaires de France / Ministère de la Culture et de la Communication-DGLFLF: 125-136]
 Cerquiglini Bernard (2000) Histoire de la langue française 1945-2000. Co-edited with Gérald Antoine. Paris: CNRS Editions, 2000.
 Clapié Jaume, & BAQUIÉ Joan Pèire (2003) Pichin lèxico ilustrat, petit lexique illustré, niçard-françés, français-niçois,  Nice: Serre
 Compan André (1965) Grammaire niçoise [re-ed. 1981, Nice: Serre]
 Compan André (1971) Anthologie de la littérature niçoise, coll. Biblioutèco d’istòri literàri e de critico, Toulon: L’Astrado
 Dalbera Jean-Philippe (1984) Les parlers des Alpes Maritimes: étude comparative, essai de reconstruction [PhD thesis], Toulouse: Université de Toulouse 2 [ed. 1994, London: Association Internationale d’Études Occitanes]
 Dalbera Jean-Philippe (2003) “Les îlots liguriens de France” [CERQUIGLINI Bernard (2003) (dir.) Les langues de France, Paris: Presses Universitaires de France / Ministère de la Culture et de la Communication-DGLFLF: 125-136]
 Escola de Bellanda (2002) Diciounari nissart-francés, Nice: Fédération des Associations du Comté de Nice / Serre
 Eynaudi Jules, & Cappati Louis (1931–1938) Dictionnaire de la langue niçoise, Niça: sn.
 Forner Werner  A propos du ligur intemelien - La cote, l'arrier-pays Traveaux du cercle linguistique de Nice 1996
 Forner Werner La dialettologia ligure. Problemi e prospettive in La dialettologia italiana oggi in G. Holtus, Tübingen 1985-1990
 Gasiglia Rémy (1984) Grammaire du nissart, sl.: Institut d’Études Niçoises
 Gauberti Pierre (1994) Dictionnaire encyclopédique de la langue de Peille [Pays Niçois], Nice: Serre
 Gioffredo Pietro Storia dele Alpi marittime libri XXIV, in HPM 1839, Torino (originally published in 1662)
 Giordan Joseph (1968) Dictionnaire français-niçois: lexique complémentaire du parler de la ville de Nice et des pays environnants, sl.: sn.
 Gourdon Marie-Louise (1997) Contribution à l’histoire de la langue occitane. Étude des systèmes graphiques pour écrire l’occitan (niçois, provençal, languedocien) de 1881 à 1919: itinéraires et travaux de A.L. Sardou, J.B. Calvino, L. Funel, A. Perbosc, P. Estieu [PdD thesis], Nice
 Liautaud René (1985) Essai de lexique français-entraunois avec correspondences en niçois, Nice: CRDP
 Miceu Giausep (1840) Grammatica nissarda: per emparà en pòou de temp lo patouas dòou paìs, Nice: Imprimarìa de la Sossietà tipografica [re-ed. Marie-Louise GOURDON (1975) La Grammatica nissarda de Joseph Micèu: biographie, étude sur les dialectes, commentaires philologiques, Nice: imprimerie Pierotti]
 Pellegrini (Abbé) (1894) Lexique niçois-français, Nice: no name
 Petracco Siccardi, Giulia L'amfizona Liguria Provenza Alessandria 1989
 Petracco Siccardi, Giulia e Caprini, Rita Toponomastica storica della Liguria, Genova, SAGEP, 1981
 Petracco Siccardi, Giulia Ligurien Lexicon der Romanistischen Linguistik II, 2, Tübingen,  1995
 Sardou Antoine Léandre, & Calvino Jean-Baptiste (1881) Grammaire de l’idiome niçois, Nice: Visconti [re-ed. 1978, Marseilles: Laffitte Reprints]
 Scaliero Giuseppe (1830) Vocabolario nizzardo, Nice: no name
 Toscano Reinat (1998) Gramàtica niçarda, no place: Princi Néguer
 Vignoli Giulio (2000) Gli Italiani Dimenticati. Minoranze Italiane In Europa. Milano: Editore Giuffrè 

Occitan language
Languages of France
Ligurian language (Romance)